George Ray's Dragstrip is an automotive drag racing strip in Paragould, Arkansas. Built in 1961 by the famous George Ray, it is the oldest single-purpose drag racing facility in Arkansas. It is located on Arkansas Highway 135, east of Paragould, with racing occurring (in season and weather permitting) every Sunday. The facility was listed on the National Register of Historic Places in 2006.

See also
National Register of Historic Places listings in Greene County, Arkansas

References

External links
George Ray's web site

Sports venues completed in 1961
Buildings and structures in Paragould, Arkansas
Drag racing venues
National Register of Historic Places in Greene County, Arkansas
Sports venues on the National Register of Historic Places in Arkansas
1961 establishments in Arkansas